Bae Ki-tae (Hangul: 배기태, Hanja: 裴基兌, born 3 May 1965 in Uijeongbu, Gyeonggi-do) is a former speed skater from South Korea. In 1990, he became the first Korean speed-skater to win a senior championship, winning gold at the World Sprint Speed Skating Championships held in Tromsø, Norway. In addition, Kim participated in the World Allround Speed Skating Championships and won the 500 metres 3 times (1987, 1988 and 1990).

References
 Skateresults.com

External links
 
 
 
 

1965 births
Living people
People from Uijeongbu
South Korean male speed skaters
Olympic speed skaters of South Korea
Speed skaters at the 1984 Winter Olympics
Speed skaters at the 1988 Winter Olympics
Asian Games medalists in speed skating
Asian Games gold medalists for South Korea
Asian Games silver medalists for South Korea
Asian Games bronze medalists for South Korea
Speed skaters at the 1986 Asian Winter Games
Speed skaters at the 1990 Asian Winter Games
Medalists at the 1986 Asian Winter Games
Medalists at the 1990 Asian Winter Games
World Sprint Speed Skating Championships medalists
Sportspeople from Gyeonggi Province
20th-century South Korean people